The Beenleigh Historical Village and Museum is an open-air museum at Main Street, Beenleigh, City of Logan, Queensland, Australia. It preserves twenty buildings from Beenleigh's past which contain many collections related to the history of this district.

History
in July 2019 the Heck family homestead "‘Friedensheim" (House of Peace), then at 129 Mill Road, Woongoolba, opposite the Rocky Point Sugar Mill, was divided into three pieces and relocated to the museum. Following work to reconstruct and restore the building, it was officially reopened in November 2021 at the museum. The homestead was built in 1914 for the Heck family who operated the sugar mill but had not been used as a home since the 1970s.

Buildings
The buildings preserved on the site include:
 the heritage-listed former St George's Anglican Church
 the council chambers of the former Shire of Beenleigh
 the Loganholme School building
 the original 1885 Beenleigh railway station building
the Heck family homestead "‘Friedensheim"

See also

List of museums in Queensland

References

External links
 

Museums in Queensland
Beenleigh, Queensland
Open-air museums in Australia